Eudocimus is a genus of ibises,  wading birds of the family Threskiornithidae. They occur in the warmer parts of the New World with representatives from the southern United States south through Central America, the West Indies, and South America.

Taxonomy and Systematics
The genus Eudocimus appears to be most closely related to (but more primitive than) Plegadis, the latter distinguished anatomically by the conformation of the tarsometatarsus. The fossil record is poor, but the Early Miocene fossil species Plegadis paganus has some intermediate features. It has two foramina in the intertrochlear groove of its distal tarsometatarsus, as do Plegadis in contrast to the single foramen of Eudocimus and many other bird species. The derived nature of this species indicates ibises belonging to Eudocimus were already in existence at this time.

A 2010 study of mitochondrial DNA of the spoonbills by Chesser and colleagues, which included E. ruber, Nipponia nippon and Threskiornis aethiopicus found that E. ruber was an early offshoot and not closely related to a clade containing the spoonbills and Old World ibises.

Remains similar to E. albus have been found in Middle Pliocene deposits of the Bone Valley formation in central Florida, and Lower Pliocene deposits of the Yorktown Formation at Lee Creek in North Carolina. Two species, one living and one extinct, have been recovered from the Talara Tar Seeps in northern coastal Peru. Eudocimus peruvianus was described from a tarsometatarsus that differed slightly from E. albus, whose remains were also found there. Remains of neither species are common in the beds. The tar seeps have been dated at 13,900 years old. The American white ibis is still found in Peru.

Species
There are just two living species in this genus, 

The two species hybridise, and are sometimes considered conspecific.

Description
These birds are found in marshy wetlands, often near coasts. They build stick nests in trees or bushes over water, and a typical clutch is two to five eggs. Eudocimus ibises are monogamous and colonial, often nesting in mixed colonies with other wading species.

Adults are 56–61 cm long with an 85–95 cm wingspan. They have long curved bills, pink legs and bare red faces. The plumage is all-white (albus) or all-scarlet (ruber), except for the black wing-tips, which are easily visible in flight. Juveniles are largely brown with white underparts and duller bare parts.

Eudocimus ibises feed by probing with their long, downcurved beaks. Their diet consists of fish, frogs, crustaceans and insects. They fly with neck and legs outstretched, often in long, loose lines, especially on their way to or from the night-time roosts.

References

 A guide to the birds of Costa Rica by F Gary Stiles and Alexander F Skutch, 
 Birds of Venezuela by Steven L Hilty, 

 
Bird genera